The 1980 Dallas Cowboys season was their 21st in the league. The team improved their previous output of 11–5, winning twelve games. They qualified for the playoffs as an NFC Wild Card, but lost in the Conference Championship game.

The season featured a very unusual end to the regular season. Going into the final week of the season, Dallas (11–4) played Philadelphia (12–3) at Texas Stadium. Under the NFL's tiebreaking rules, if Dallas could beat the Eagles by 25 points, they would earn the NFC East title and the number two seed in the NFC playoffs while Philadelphia would be a wildcard team. However, if the Cowboys lost (or won by less than 25) then the roles would reverse.

Dallas led the game 35–10 in the fourth quarter, but the Eagles rallied to lose by only 35–27. This forced Dallas to play an extra week in the playoffs and a road game in Atlanta in the Divisional Round. Dallas ultimately lost at Philadelphia in the NFC Championship Game.

Offseason

NFL Draft

Undrafted free agents

Schedule

Division opponents are in bold text

Game summaries

Week 1 at Redskins

Week 2

Week 3

Week 4

Week 5

Week 6

Week 7

Week 8

Week 9

Week 10

Week 11

Week 12

Week 13

Week 14

Week 15

Week 16

Playoffs

Wildcard Round

Divisional Round

Conference Championship

Standings

Roster

References

Dallas Cowboys seasons
Dallas Cowboys
Dallas